Brigadier-General Herbert Thomas Dobbin CBE DSO (1878-1946) was a British Infantry officer of the Duke of Cornwall's Light Infantry. He commanded a number of Battalions during the First World War and in 1918 was appointed GOC of the 75th Brigade. After the War he became Commandant of the Iraq Levies and Colonel Commandant of the Duke of Cornwall's Light Infantry.

Early life 
Herbert Thomas Dobbin was the son of Lieutenant-Colonel G. M. Dobbin and was born on 27 May 1878. He was educated at Bedford Modern School and was commissioned a second-lieutenant in the Duke of Cornwall's Light Infantry on 18 January 1899. He saw active service in Africa, and from 1911-13 was commander of the Gambia Company, part of the West African Frontier Force.

First World War 
As an experienced professional soldier Dobbin was attached to a variety of Regiments as battalion commander during the War. From 29 June to 6 September 1916 he commanded the 1/4th Battalion, Gloucestershire Regiment. From 7 September 1916 to 24 February 1917, he commanded the 1/8th Battalion, Royal Warwickshire Regiment. From 30 May 1917 to 11 July 1917 he commanded the 1/8th (Ardwick) Battalion of the Manchester Regiment at Havrincourt Wood, after which he was appointed the Commander of the 4th Army Military School. He was appointed GOC of the 75th Infantry Brigade on 8 February 1918 and was its commander during the German offensive at the First Battle of Bapaume during the following month.

He was awarded the DSO in 1916 and was Mentioned in Despatches three times. He was also awarded the Croix de Guerre.

Post-War Service 
After the war Dobbin saw further service in West Africa before assuming command of the Iraq Levies in October 1922. This was a force of roughly brigade-strength drawn in large numbers from Iraq's non-Muslim population. In 1923 Dobbin was appointed a CBE in recognition of his command of this force. In 1926 he returned to England and until 1930 served as Colonel-Commandant of the Duke of Cornwall's Light Infantry.

Herbert Dobbin retired from the Army in 1935. He died at Budleigh Salterton, Devon on 9 September 1946. He was unmarried.

References 

1878 births
1946 deaths
People educated at Bedford Modern School
Duke of Cornwall's Light Infantry officers
Companions of the Distinguished Service Order
Commanders of the Order of the British Empire
British Army generals of World War I
British Army brigadiers